Vantika Agrawal (born 28 September 2002) is an Indian chess player who holds the FIDE title of Woman Grandmaster.

Biography
In 2016, Agrawal won bronze medal in World Youth Chess Championship U14 girls age group.

In 2020 she, with Indian national team, won FIDE Online Chess Olympiad 2020.

In 2021 Vantika Agrawal won silver medal in Indian Junior Girls Online Chess Championship and won gold medal in Indian Junior Senior Women Chess Championship. At the same year she also won FIDE Binance Business Schools Supercup.

In November 2021 in Riga Vantika Agrawal ranked in 14th place in FIDE Women's Grand Swiss Tournament 2021.

She received the Woman Grandmaster (WGM) title in 2021 and the Woman International Master (WIM) title in 2017.

References

External links
 
 
 

2002 births
Living people
Indian female chess players
Chess woman grandmasters